The Film Academy of Miroslav Ondříček in Písek (FAMO) is a private film university which was established in 2004 by Czech documentary cameraman and school owner / director Miloň Terč. The patron of the school, and school name are dedicated to famous Czech cinematographer Miroslav Ondříček. The school offers accredited Bachelor and Master Degree programs in the Czech and English languages.

Location
FAMO's single campus and studios are located in Písek in the South Bohemian Region.

Studies
Studies at the school take place in the field of audio-visual design, and students have the choice to major in:
Directing
Screenwriting and dramaturgy 
Documentary film
Cinematography 
Editing
Sound design 
Production
Visual effects and animation

Film schools in the Czech Republic
Písek